The Center on Juvenile and Criminal Justice is a San Francisco-based nonprofit organization dedicated to reducing the United States' reliance on incarceration. It was established in 1985 by Jerome G. Miller as the San Francisco branch of the National Center on Institutions and Alternatives, and established as a separate 501(c)3 nonprofit organization in 1991.

References

Non-profit organizations based in San Francisco
1985 establishments in California
Organizations established in 1985
Criminal justice reform in the United States